Ugia transversa is a species of moth in the family Erebidae first described by Frederic Moore in 1882. It is found from the north-eastern Himalayas to southern China.

References

Ugia
Moths of Asia
Moths described in 1882